The Indian locomotive class WDS-6 is a diesel-electric locomotive used by the Indian Railways mainly for shunting and also for performing departmental duties. The model name stands for broad gauge (W), Diesel (D), Shunting  (S) engine, 6th generation (6). As of April 2022, 375 units of this class are currently in use all over India.

History
This class was designed in 1975 to address the need for a powerful shunting locomotive with the ability  to haul 20- to 24-coach rakes. The previous WDS-4 class was found to be grossly underpowered for this kind of operation. A WDS-6 locomotive basically consists of a YDM-4 powerpack (a 6-cylinder, 4-stroke, inline, turbo-supercharged ALCo engine) mounted on a WDM-2 body frame. 
Beginning in 1975, these were initially manufactured solely by BLW, Varanasi, but later, the Parel Workshop started building them using CKD (completely-knocked-down) kits provided by DLW.
WDS-6 units can be easily recognized by their low short hoods (with two cab windows above these) and flat-ended cabs on the long-hood end. Many of them were sold and transferred to private industrial concerns and public sector undertakings (PSUs) in huge numbers, but still display their IR road numbers.

Locomotive sheds

Technical specifications

Gallery

See also

 Rail transport in India#History
 Locomotives of India
 Rail transport in India
 Indian locomotive class YDM-4

Bibliography

References

RDSO document for WDS-6(archived copy)
https://www.irfca.org/faq/faq-loco2d.html
https://www.irfca.org/faq/faq-specs.html#WDS-6
https://www.irfca.org/apps/locos/list

S-6
Co-Co locomotives
Banaras Locomotive Works locomotives
Railway locomotives introduced in 1975
5 ft 6 in gauge locomotives